European Universities Karate Championships were first organised in 2003 and have been organised every two years since.

The European Universities Karate Championships are coordinated by the European University Sports Association along with the 18 other sports on the program of the European universities championships.

Summary

Results 2003

Results 2005

Results 2007

Results 2009

Results 2011

Results 2013

See also

External links 
 

karate
Karate competitions
Karate in Europe